Clemson University is a public land-grant research university in Clemson, South Carolina. Founded in 1889, Clemson is the second-largest university by enrollment in South Carolina. For the fall 2019 semester, the university enrolled a total of 20,195 undergraduate students and 5,627 graduate students, and the student/faculty ratio was 18:1. Clemson's 1,400-acre campus  is in the foothills of the Blue Ridge Mountains. The campus now borders Lake Hartwell, which was formed by the dam completed in 1962. The university manages the nearby 17,500-acre Clemson Experimental Forest that is used for research, education, and recreation.

Clemson University consists of seven colleges: Agriculture, Forestry and Life Sciences; Architecture, Arts and Humanities; The Wilbur O. and Ann Powers College of Business; Behavioral, Social and Health Sciences; Education; Engineering, Computing and Applied Sciences; and Science. U.S. News & World Report ranks Clemson University 77th for 2022 among national U.S. universities.  Clemson University is classified among "R1: Doctoral Universities – Very high research activity."

History

Beginnings

Thomas Green Clemson, the university's founder, came to the foothills of South Carolina in 1838, when he married Anna Maria Calhoun, daughter of John C. Calhoun, South Carolina statesman and seventh U.S. Vice President. When Clemson died on April 6, 1888, he left most of his estate, which he inherited from his wife, in his will to be used to establish a college that would teach scientific agriculture and the mechanical arts to South Carolinians. His decision was largely influenced by the future South Carolina Governor Benjamin Tillman. Tillman lobbied the South Carolina General Assembly to create the school as an agricultural institution for the state and the resolution passed by only one vote.

In his will, Clemson explicitly stated he wanted the school to be modeled after what is now Mississippi State University: "This institution, I desire, to be under the control and management of a board of trustees, a part of whom are hereinafter appointed, and to be modeled after the Agricultural College of Mississippi as far as practicable."

Clemson Agricultural College of South Carolina

In November 1889, South Carolina Governor John Peter Richardson III signed the bill, thus establishing the Clemson Agricultural College of South Carolina. As a result, federal funds for agricultural education from the Morrill Land-Grant Colleges Act and the Hatch Act of 1887 were transferred from South Carolina College (today, the University of South Carolina) to Clemson. Construction of the college began with Hardin Hall in 1890 and then main classroom buildings in 1891. Convict laborers, some as young as 13 years old, built many of the original buildings on campus. Henry Aubrey Strode became the first president of Clemson from 1890 to 1893. Edwin Craighead succeeded Strode in 1893. Clemson Agricultural College formally opened in July 1893 with an initial enrollment of 446. The common curriculum of the first incoming students was English, history, botany, mathematics, physics, and agriculture. Until 1955, the college was also an all-white male military school.

On May 22, 1894, the main building (Tillman Hall) was destroyed by a fire, which consumed the library, classrooms, and offices. Tillman Hall was rebuilt in 1894 and is still standing today. The first graduating class of Clemson was in 1896 with degrees in mechanical-electrical engineering and agriculture. Clemson's first football team began in 1896 led by trainer Walter Riggs. Henry Hartzog, a graduate of The Citadel, The Military College of South Carolina, became president of Clemson in 1897. Hartzog created a textile department in 1898. Clemson became the first Southern school to train textile specialists. Hartzog expanded the curriculum with more industrialization skills such as foundry work, agriculture studies, and mechanics. In 1902 a large student walkout over the use of rigid military discipline escalated tensions between students and faculty forcing Hartzog to resign. Patrick Mell succeeded Hartzog from 1902 to 1910.

Following the resignation of Mell in 1910 former Clemson Tigers football coach Walter Riggs became president of Clemson from 1910 to 1924. The Holtzendorff Hall, originally the Holzendorff YMCA, was built in 1914 designed by Rudolph E. Lee of the first graduating class of Clemson in 1896. In 1915 Riggs Field was dedicated after Walter Riggs and is the Clemson Tigers men's soccer home field. During World War I enrollment in Clemson declined. In 1917 Clemson formed a Reserve Officers' Training Corps and in 1918 a Student Army Training Corps was formed. Effects of World War I made Clemson hire the first women faculty due to changes in faculty. Riggs accepted a six-month army educational commission in 1919 overseas in France leaving Samuel Earle as acting president. On March 10, 1920, a large walkout occurred protesting unfair "prison camp" style military discipline. The 1920 walkout led to the creation of a Department of Student Affairs. On January 22, 1924, Riggs died on a business trip to Washington, D.C. leaving Earle the acting president. In October 1924 another walkout of around 500 students occurred when Earle rejected their demands of better food and the dismissal of mess officer Harcombe and the reinstatement of their senior class president. The 1924 walkout resulted in 23 students dismissed and 112 suspended.

On April 1, 1925, a fire destroyed the interior of the agricultural building and its many research projects and an agricultural museum. The exterior of the building survived, leading to the construction of Sikes Hall to hold the library from Tillman Hall. On May 27, 1926, Mechanical Hall was destroyed in a fire. Present-day Freeman Hall, built in 1926, was the reconstructed shop building. In 1928 Riggs Hall was established in honor of Walter Riggs. President Enoch Sikes increased student enrollment by over 1,000 students and expanded the degree programs with an addition of the first graduate degree. The Department of Arts and Sciences was formed in 1926 with the addition of modern language programs. Programs at Clemson were reorganized into six schools of agriculture, chemistry, engineering, general science, textiles, and vocational studies. In 1927 Clemson received accreditation from the Association of Secondary Schools and Colleges of the Southern States.

During The Great Depression student enrollment and income declined. The New Deal brought needed construction to the campus under the Works Progress Administration with new dormitories to relieve the housing shortages. Long Hall, Sirrine Hall, and 29,625 acres of privately owned farmland was acquired by Clemson through federal funding. Agricultural engineers of Clemson diversified with the Clemson Agricultural Extension to educate farmers on soil conservation and crop storage techniques during The Great Depression. Robert Poole became the first Clemson alumnus to be president in 1940. On September 19, 1942 Memorial Stadium was formally opened as the new stadium for the Clemson Tigers football team previously played on Riggs Field since 1915.

During World War II more than 6,500 students were sent overseas in the military. As a result of the Clemson ROTC, around 5,850 were commissioned officers. The class of 1943 had a historical low of 343 graduates. By the end of the war, 376 Clemson students had been killed in it.

Becoming civilian and coeducational and desegregated
In 1955 Clemson underwent a major restructuring and was transformed into "civilian" status for students. It began admitting white women; the university was still segregated.

In 1963, the school admitted its first African-American student, Harvey Gantt, who later was elected as mayor of Charlotte, North Carolina.

Clemson University
In 1964, the college was renamed Clemson University, as the state legislature formally recognized the school's expanded academic offerings and research pursuits.

In 2015, students protested against Tillman Hall being named for Ben Tillman. Tillman, a Democrat, was a South Carolina Governor and United States Senator and was a white supremacist during the Reconstruction era as well as a member of the Red Shirts and a known associate of the Ku Klux Klan. The Board of Trustees voted against renaming the building. In the summer of 2020, following the murder of George Floyd, the trustees petitioned the state legislature to remove Ben Tillman's name from the building and restoring the original name ("Old Main"), at the same time it renamed the honors program, which had been named for John C. Calhoun. As of July 2021, no changes have been made toward renaming the building.

Campus

Academics

Admissions

Undergraduate

The 2022 annual ranking of U.S. News & World Report categorizes Clemson as 'more selective'. For the Class of 2025 (enrolled fall 2021), Clemson received 47,007 applications and accepted 23,138 (49.2%). Of those accepted, 4,589 enrolled, a yield rate (the percentage of accepted students who choose to attend the university) of 19.8%. Clemson's freshman retention rate is 94%, with 85.5% going on to graduate within six years.

The enrolled first-year class of 2025 had the following standardized test scores: the middle 50% range (25th percentile-75th percentile) of SAT scores was 1240-1400, while the middle 50% range of ACT scores was 27-32.

Colleges and schools

In July 1955, the four schools that made up Clemson ― Agriculture, Arts & Sciences, Engineering and Textiles ― were transformed into nine colleges: Architecture, Arts and Sciences, Liberal Arts, Sciences, Commerce and Industry, Education, Engineering, Forestry and Recreation Resources, and Nursing. This structure was used by the university until 1995 when the university's nine colleges were condensed into five: Agriculture, Forestry, and Life Sciences; Architecture, Arts, and Humanities; Business and Behavioral Science; Engineering and Science; Health, Education, and Human Development. , the Eugene T. Moore School of Education broke off from the College of Health, Education, and Human development, thus becoming the sixth college.

An academic reorganization effective July 1, 2016, created seven new colleges: College of Agriculture, Forestry and Life Sciences; College of Architecture, Arts and Humanities; College of Behavioral, Social and Health Sciences; College of Business; College of Education (including the Eugene T. Moore School of Education); College of Engineering, Computing and Applied Sciences; and College of Science.

College of Agriculture, Forestry, and Life Sciences
The College of Agriculture, Forestry, and Life Sciences (CAFLS) supports Clemson University's land-grant mission to provide education, research, and service to the public. CAFLS faculty members teach major subjects and core curricula while preparing students to be leaders, creative thinkers, and communicators.  Emphasis is placed on engaging students in research, internships/coops, study abroad, and service learning. CAFLS research is focused on the sustainability of agriculture, forests, and natural resources; food and packaging systems to ensure a healthy and safe food supply, and biomedical sciences to improve human and non-human health.

College of Architecture, Arts, and Humanities

The College of Architecture, Arts, and Humanities (CAAH) contains three schools: the School of the Arts, the School of Design and Building, and the School of the Humanities. Within these schools are ten departments: Art, Architecture, Construction Science and Management, English, History, Landscape Architecture, Languages, Performing Arts, Philosophy and Religion, and Planning, Development, and Restoration. One of the departments of the college, the School of Architecture, was ranked as the  No. 16 graduate school for architecture in the country by Design Intelligence. The Brooks Center serves as performing arts venue for the college.

Wilbur O. and Ann Powers College of Business
The College of Business is accredited by the Association to Advance Collegiate Schools of Business.

College of Engineering, Computing and Applied Sciences

The College of Engineering, Computing, and Applied Sciences (CECAS) specializes in engineering as well as the physical sciences such as physics and chemistry. Inspired by Thomas Green Clemson's dream to create a "high seminary of learning to benefit the agricultural and mechanical arts," engineering and sciences have been an integral part of the university's development. Since the first degrees were granted in 1896, Clemson engineers and scientists have made significant contributions to South Carolina, the nation, and the world.

CECAS was formed in 1995, joining the engineering disciplines with the chemistry, computer science, geological science, mathematical science, and physics and astronomy departments.

College of Health and Human Development
The College of Health and Human Development focuses on public health sciences, nursing, education, and parks, recreation, and tourism management.

Clemson University Honors College
The Clemson University Honors College focuses on education for highly motivated, academically talented students. Entrance to the college is very competitive, with only 250 incoming freshmen accepted each year with an average SAT score of 1400 or higher and finished in the top 3% of their high school graduating class. The college was founded in 1962 and originally named for John C. Calhoun, a South Carolina native and politician, who was the vice president of the United States from 1825 to 1832.

College of Education
The College of Education is Clemson's newest college. It is centered in the famous Tillman Hall. The college has some 600 undergraduate students, and 600 graduate students, with the mission to embrace the diverse faculty, staff, and students and provide them with a diverse set of experiences. The COE also houses the Call Me MISTER Program and the Moore Scholars.

On June 12, 2020, university trustees petitioned the state legislature for authorization to rename Tillman Hall. “Pitchfork” Ben Tillman was a governor and U.S. senator who used virulent racism to dominate South Carolina politics after Reconstruction.

Graduate school
The Graduate School offers more than 100 graduate degree programs in 85 disciplines on the college's main campus and at sites such as Clemson at the Falls and the Clemson University International Center for Automotive Research in Greenville, the Clemson Architecture Center in the historic Cigar Factory in Charleston, the Restoration Institute in North Charleston, as well as some online/distance-learning programs. Many of the graduate programs are highly ranked nationally, and the school offers several unique interdisciplinary programs.

Rankings
Admission to Clemson is rated "more selective" by U.S. News & World Report.

For the Class of 2022 (enrolling Fall 2018), Clemson received 28,845 applications and accepted 13,613 (47.2%), with 3,792 enrolling. The middle 50% range of SAT scores for enrolling freshmen was 610-690 for reading and writing, and 610-710 for math. The middle 50% ACT composite score range was 27–32. The average high school grade point average (GPA) was 4.43.

For 2021, U.S. News & World Report ranked Clemson as tied for the 74th best national university in the U.S. overall, and tied for the 29th top public school.

In 2016, The Princeton Review ranked Clemson University number one in three categories: Student Career Services, Town-Gown Relations, and Students pack the stadium.

Research
The Clemson University International Center for Automotive Research (CU-ICAR) was established in 2013 in Greenville as a seminary for automotive research and innovation. CU-ICAR is a  automotive and motorsports research campus. The department of Automotive Engineering was ranked tenth in the world in 2015. CU-ICAR includes a graduate school offering master's and doctoral degrees in automotive engineering, and programs focused on systems integration. The campus also includes an Information Technology Research Center being developed by BMW. BMW, Microsoft, IBM, Bosch, Timken, JTEKT/Koyo and Michelin are all major corporate partners of CU-ICAR. Private-sector companies that have committed to establishing offices and/or facilities on the campus include the Society of Automotive Engineers and Timken. Plans for the campus also include a full-scale, four-vehicle capacity rolling road wind tunnel.

In 2004 the Restoration Institute was founded in North Charleston. Its mission is to "advance knowledge in integrative approaches to the restoration of historic, ecological, and urban infrastructure resources." The institute includes the Hunley Commission which is undertaking the stabilization of the H. L. Hunley, a Civil War submarine that was the world's first to sink a ship. , the institute is constructing a 7.5MW and a 15MW wind turbine test facility for $100 million

In 2016, Clemson announced a new partnership with Siemens, including a grant with a total value of $357,224,294. This grant is the largest in the school's history. Through it, students in Clemson's College of Engineering, Computing, and Applied Sciences will have access to a variety of new software.

In 2015, Clemson University broke ground on the Zucker Family Graduate Education Center in the City of North Charleston. The 70,000 sq. ft. facility is estimated to cost more than $22 million.

Student life

Intramurals

In addition to their varsity programs, Clemson offers a wide variety of intramural sports:

 Basketball
 Billiards
 Bowling
 Cornhole
 Dodgeball
 Flag football
 Indoor soccer
 Kickball
 Racquetball
 Soccer
 Softball
 Spikeball
 Tennis
 Ultimate Frisbee
 Volleyball
 Wiffleball

Fraternity and sorority life

The university's fraternities and sororities system (or Greek system) is somewhat different from other large universities in the southern U.S. in that there are no Greek houses on campus, as interfraternity activity did not begin until 1970, following the abolishment of the military cadre requirements at the university. There are residence halls designated for fraternities and sororities, but there are no traditional Greek houses on campus. However, there are a few fraternity houses off campus near the college. The Fraternity Quad on campus (consisting of seven fraternity and sorority halls) is certified by the U.S. Green Building Council's Leadership in Energy and Environmental Design (LEED) program. The remaining sororities' on-campus housing is on the other end of campus, in what is commonly referred to as "the horseshoe," in Smith and Barnett Halls.

The College Panhellenic Council Chapters at Clemson University include Alpha Chi Omega, Alpha Delta Pi, Alpha Phi, Chi Omega, Delta Delta Delta, Delta Gamma (2021), Delta Zeta, Gamma Phi Beta, Kappa Delta, Kappa Kappa Gamma, Pi Beta Phi, Sigma Kappa, and Zeta Tau Alpha.  The Interfraternity Council Chapters include Alpha Gamma Rho, Alpha Sigma Phi, Alpha Tau Omega, Beta Theta Pi, Beta Upsilon Chi, Chi Phi, Delta Chi, Delta Tau Delta, FarmHouse, Kappa Alpha Order, Kappa Sigma, Pi Kappa Alpha, Phi Gamma Delta, Phi Delta Theta, Phi Sigma Kappa, Sigma Alpha Epsilon, Sigma Nu, Theta Chi, Tau Kappa Epsilon, Psi Upsilon, and Triangle.

As of the fall 2017 semester, there are twenty IFC Fraternities, thirteen NPC Sororities, eight NPHC Chapters, and four MGC Chapters, which make up approximately 23 percent of the undergraduate student body.

In 2017 15% of men and 31% of women were involved in Greek life, out of 19,825 undergraduate students. While the required GPA to join Greek life is 2.7, the mean GPA of each sorority was above the all-university mean.

Military heritage
Although the university became a coeducational civilian institution in 1955, it still maintains an active military presence. Cadets still participate during home football games, during which cadets hold the ropes as the team enters from the Hill, and they complete pushups for every Clemson point scored, just as the Tiger does.

The university is home to detachments for U.S. Army and U.S. Air Force Reserve Officers' Training Corps (ROTC) as well as a host school for the U.S. Marine Corps PLC program adjacent to the Semper Fi Society.

In addition to students from the university, these organizations also serve students from Anderson University, Southern Wesleyan University, Bob Jones University,  and Tri-County Technical College. The following organizations are present among the military personnel at Clemson:
 Company C-4 Pershing Rifles
 K-7 Scabbard and Blade
 Maj. Rudolf Anderson, Jr Squadron Arnold Air Society (AAS)
 Maj. Dennis H. Satler Chapter Silver Wings
 Clemson Rangers
 Tiger Platoon
 Clemson Corps

The university's AAS squadron was selected to be home of Arnold Air Society's National Headquarters for the 2005–2006 year, and again for the 2006–2007 year. This is the first time in AAS's history that any university has served as national headquarters two years in a row. The squadron again serves as national headquarters for the 2015–16 school year.

The C-4 Pershing Rifles have won the national society's drill meet nine times: 1999, 2003, 2004, 2005, 2006, 2008, 2009, 2011, and 2017. Company C-4 also performs colorguards, twenty-one-gun salutes, exhibition-drill performances, and POW/MIA ceremonies. Company C-4 performs Colorguard performance at the university's home football games. In addition to the C-4 drill company, the university is the former home of the fourth Regimental Headquarters (4RHQ), the National Headquarters for the Junior ROTC level of Pershing Rifles (BlackJacks), and the Co-ed Auxiliary for Pershing Rifles (CAPeRs).

Its Air Force ROTC Detachment 770 "Flyin' Tigers" was selected as the No. 1 "medium-sized" Air Force ROTC detachment in the nation for 2006 (the "High Flight" and "Right of Line" awards), No. 1 Detachment in the "Southeast" in 2006 ("medium-sized") and 2007 ("large-sized"), and No. 1 in the state of South Carolina (out of three—the University of South Carolina and The Citadel) for three consecutive years (2005, 2006 and 2007).

The university has also developed a group of Marines and Marine Officer Candidates within an organization called the Semper Fi Society. The society is not associated with the ROTC but can lead to a commission into the U.S. Marine Corps via the Platoon Leaders Course program.

Student media
Clemson University has five completely student-run media outlets. These organizations operate under Tiger Media, the university's student media department, and are each on the third floor of the Hendrix Student Center. These include The Tiger, Tigervision, The Pendulum, The Chronicle, and WSBF-FM.

Founded in 1907, The Tiger is the oldest student-run newspaper in South Carolina. The Tiger publishes local and university-related news pieces. Additionally, the paper publishes opinion articles on general and national issues, and lifestyle articles on topics such as food, sex, and music. With sports being a major part of Clemson University's culture and events, The Tiger also contains a large sports section focusing on football, basketball, baseball, and soccer. The Tiger is printed biweekly, on Thursdays, and maintains a staff of over 30 senior members and numerous contributing staff.

The Tiger Town Observer is a conservative news magazine that focuses on university politics. The magazine identifies itself as a "traditionally conservative" news source and lists its political values as liberty, transparency, lifelong learning, free market, and charity.

Tigervision, Clemson's student-run TV station, broadcasts on channel 88 on the university's campus cable network. The station was created in 1994 under the name Clemson Cable Network by students at WSBF-FM who were interested in television production. The station aired a variety of student-created content as well as recently released movies via a licensing agreement. By 2006, after experiencing a decline in membership and viewers, CCN was no longer consistently producing content and fell into relative obscurity. However, in 2007, CCN was reorganized into Clemson Television and began to produce student comedy shows as well as airing public domain films. As content quality began to increase, so did membership. In 2014, CTV was renamed Tigervision to coincide with its switch to high-definition broadcasting.

TAPS Yearbook was established in 1907 after members of the Clemson College Chronicle, the literary arts magazine at the time, wanted to publish a new book printed annually. It is named after the song "Taps", which was played each night when cadets went to bed during the college's time as a military school. Each edition of TAPS contains student portraits, information on student organizations, and reviews of the past year's events. In 2017, TAPS announced the end of the 2017–18 academic year would mark the final edition of the yearbook. Its student media group will replace it with a quarterly interest magazine beginning in fall 2018.

WSBF-FM was founded in 1958 and made its first broadcast on April 1, 1960. In the beginning, WSBF's content was mostly agriculture education shows and classical music. By the mid-1960s, the station began to air sports programs such as The Frank Howard Show along with the news. The station would eventually shift to a "progressive" format where it focused on new, up-and-coming contemporary music groups. During the 1980s, the format would shift gradually changed to the station's current "alternative" format. WSBF plays a variety of genres including jazz, rap, punk, rock, and folk focusing on independent artists. The station broadcasts to the Clemson area and upstate South Carolina on 88.1 FM as well as online.

The Chronicle is a literary art magazine that publishes biannually. It was founded in 1897 and prints student-created content ranging from poetry, short stories, photography, and drawings.

The Pendulum is a student-run international affairs magazine. It was established in 2014 and officially joined Tiger Media the following year. It publishes twice a year during the fall and focuses on international politics, economics, and global affairs. The Pendulum often takes these topics and discusses how they affect students and the Clemson community.

The Sensible Tiger is a student-run weekly newsletter established in 2018 which provides students with brief, non-partisan news in an effort ease political divides on campus. The Sensible Tiger has interviewed 2019 Democratic candidate Beto O'Rourke and Washington Post contributor Josh Dawsey, and produces a biweekly Spotify podcast entitled "The Watercooler."

Traditions

Tiger Paw

The Tiger paw became the official logo for Clemson University in 1970, in place of the previous tiger logo. The change was inspired by President Robert Edwards to "upgrade the image of the university." The Tiger Paw logo was introduced at a press conference on July 21, 1970. It was created by John Antonio and developed by Helen Weaver of Henderson Advertising in Greenville, South Carolina, from a mold of a Bengal tiger sent to the agency by the Field Museum of Natural History in Chicago. The paw is now used on all athletic teams and collegiate documents. The tiger paw is also painted on surfaces throughout campus and on highways leading to the campus.

Homecoming and Tigerama

Every year Clemson students have the opportunity to attend Homecoming and Tigerama. The Clemson Homecoming tradition began in 1914 and has been held annually at Clemson University ever since. During homecoming week, various student organizations design and build Homecoming floats on Bowman Field. The floats are then revealed on the Saturday of the football game and judged by a select panel. Since 1957, Clemson has held "Tigerama" on the Friday night of homecoming week. Tigerama is one of the nation's largest student-run-pep rallies, averaging about 40,000 people. This Clemson event includes the crowning of Miss Homecoming, skits by various academic organizations, as well as a fireworks show.

First Friday Parade
The First Friday Parade has been held on the Friday before the first home football game every year since 1974. The parade includes fraternities, sororities, the Clemson marching band, the university President, as well as many other student organizations.  The parade route travels through portions of Highway 93 and Main Street and concludes at the university's amphitheater, where the first pep rally of the year is held. In 1985, the parade had its highest attendance, when accompanying CBS commentators were the Grand Marshalls.

Alma mater
The Clemson University alma mater originated in the 1910s after a group of Clemson ROTC cadets in May 1918 was asked to sing the school's song at a gathering of ROTC cadets in Plattsburgh, New York; they were unable to do so, as Clemson had no song at the time. One of the cadets in attendance, A.C. Corcoran of Charleston, South Carolina, decided to remedy the situation and wrote the words to the alma mater and set them to Annie Lisle, which was the melody of Cornell University's alma mater, as well as many others. The words were later officially accepted by the then-named Clemson Agricultural College as the alma mater and were first performed by the Clemson Glee Club on February 17, 1919.

In 1947 the club "Tiger Brotherhood" decided that, rather than continue borrowing another school's melody, the university should compose its own. As a result, the Tiger Brotherhood sponsored a contest to have Clemson students compose a unique melody. On May 5, 1947, Clemson University's school newspaper "The Tiger" announced Robert E. Farmer of Anderson, South Carolina, a member of the glee club at the time, as the winner. Farmer's melody was slightly altered in 1970 but was restored to its original tune in 2009.

Fight song
The university's fight song is the jazz standard, the "Tiger Rag".

Memorial Stadium traditions

Athletics

Clemson University teams are known as the Tigers. They compete as a member of the National Collegiate Athletic Association (NCAA) Division I level (Football Bowl Subdivision (FBS) sub-level for football), primarily competing in the Atlantic Coast Conference (ACC) for all sports since the 1953–54 season. Men's sports include baseball, basketball, cross country, football, golf, soccer, tennis, and track & field; while women's sports include basketball, cross country, golf, rowing, soccer, diving, tennis, track & field, softball, and volleyball.

The most-prominent athletics facilities on campus are Memorial Stadium, Littlejohn Coliseum, Doug Kingsmore Stadium, Historic Riggs Field, and Fike Recreation Center. Clemson has won 7 national championships including 3 in football (1981, 2016, and 2018), 3 in men's soccer (1984, 1987, and 2021), and men's golf (2003).

In 2020, university officials decided to dissolve its Men's Track and Field and Cross Country teams at the end of the academic year.  Despite pressure from student activists, the university did not reverse its decision until a class-action Title IX lawsuit was formed. Following pressure from state officials, the university reversed its decision on April 22, 2021. The university followed this by announcing the additions of women's lacrosse and gymnastics.

Public safety
Clemson University operates with the Clemson University Police Department and the Clemson University Fire & EMS for public safety needs. Both departments are staffed 24 hours a day, 7 days a week. The Clemson University Fire & EMS has one station, at 1521 Perimeter Road. The Police Department is located at 124 Ravenel Center Place, Seneca.

Notable alumni

 Major Rudolf Anderson Jr. Class of 1948, was the only person killed by enemy fire during the Cuban Missile Crisis.
 David Beasley, South Carolina governor (1995–1999).
 Kris Benson, professional baseball player
 Jay Berger (born 1966), professional tennis player.
 Tajh Boyd (born 1990), Clemson football player.
 Robert H. Brooks, founder of Hooters of America, Inc.
 Jonathan Byrd, professional golfer.
 James F. Byrnes, U.S. Congressman, Senator, U.S. Supreme Court Justice (1941–1942), Secretary of State (1945–1947), Governor of South Carolina (1951–1955), and confidant of President Franklin D. Roosevelt.
 Dwight Clark, professional football player.
 Wynn Coggins, acting Secretary of Commerce under Joe Biden. 
 Chad Connelly, Chairman of the South Carolina Republican Party
 Brian Dawkins, professional football player.
 Dave Dondero, singer-songwriter andguitarist.
 Steven Duggar (born 1993), professional baseball player.
 Lt. Col. Jimmie Dyess, of the United States Marine Corps, the only person to earn both the Congressional Medal of Honor and the Carnegie Medal of Honor.
 Ekwee Ethuro, Speaker of the Kenyan Senate.
 Harvey Gantt, first Black Mayor of Charlotte. 
 Lucas Glover, professional golfer.
 Nikki Haley, former Governor of South Carolina and former United States Ambassador to the United Nations
 James M. Henderson, advertising executive in Greenville; Republican candidate for Lieutenant Governor of South Carolina in 1970.
 Stuart Holden, professional soccer player.
 DeAndre Hopkins, professional football player.
 Rob Huebel, actor.
 Autar Kaw (born 1960), 2012 U.S. Professor of the Year, Professor University of South Florida
 Kristie A. Kenney, United States Ambassador to Thailand and former Ambassador to the Philippines.
 Trevor Lawrence, professional football player.
 Brad Miller, professional baseball player.
 Rory "McAlister" Murray, WWE Wrestler and member of The Highlanders.
 Nancy O'Dell, television host and entertainment journalist.
 Oguchi Onyewu, professional soccer player.
 William "Refrigerator" Perry, professional football player.
 Gen John W. Raymond, first Chief of Space Operations for the United States Space Force, former commander of the United States Space Command.
 Jane Robelot, American television host.
 Ben Robertson, war correspondent in World War II, author.
 Brianna Rollins, track and field athlete, 2016 Summer Olympics gold medalist.
 Phillip Sandifer, writer and recording artist.
 Jim Speros, formerly the majority owner of the Baltimore Stallions of the CFL, UFL Norfolk; youngest assistant coach in NFL history
 C. J. Spiller, professional football player.
 Elijah Thomas (born 1996), professional basketball player.
 Strom Thurmond, U.S. Senator from South Carolina who was the longest-serving Senator in U.S. history
 Sammy Watkins, professional football player.
 Deshaun Watson, professional football player.
 Shawn Weatherly, Miss Universe 1980.
 Jaw Shaw-kong, former member of the Legislative Yuan of Taiwan, founder of Taiwan's New Party.
 David H. Wilkins, former U.S. Ambassador to Canada; former Speaker of the South Carolina House of Representatives, the first Republican Speaker in the South since Reconstruction.
Vanessa E. Wyche, Director of the Johnson Space Center.

Notable faculty
Donald D. Clayton, Professor of Physics & Astronomy (1989-2007); known for his pioneering work in Nuclear Astrophysics. 
Thomas Hazlett, Hugh H. Macaulay Endowed Professor of Economics (since 2014); co-author of "Public Policy Toward Cable Television" 
John W. Huffman, Research Professor of Chemistry and creator of many synthetic cannabinoid compounds, including JWH-018, one of the main ingredients in Spice (drug).
Jo Jorgensen, United States Libertarian Party candidate for President of the United States in the 2020 United States presidential election and candidate for vice-president in the 1996 United States Presidential Election
Donald Liebenberg, Adjunct Professor of Physics and Astronomy; known for his work related to solar eclipses
Trudy Mackay, Self Family Chair in Human Genetics and Professor of Genetics and Biochemistry.
Michael J. Padilla, former Director of the Eugene T. Moore School of Education
June Pilcher, Alumni Distinguished Professor of Psychology
Ramakrishna Podila, Assistant Professor of Physics, director of the Clemson Nano-bio lab
Apparao M Rao, Professor of Physics
David Reinking, Eugene T. Moore Professor of Education (since 2003); co-editor of Reading Research Quarterly, a peer-reviewed journal published by the International Reading Association
C. Bradley Thompson, BB&T Research Professor in the Department of Political Science and the Executive Director of the Clemson Institute for the Study of Capitalism
Robert Tollison, Professor of Economics
Antony Valentini, Professor in the Department of Physics and Astronomy 2011–2018. 
Nicholas Vazsonyi, Dean of the College of Architecture, Arts and Humanities
Victor J. Vitanza, Professor of Rhetoric
Bruce Yandle, Dean Emeritus of Clemson University's College of Business and Behavioral Science and Alumni Distinguished Professor of Economics Emeritus.

See also
 List of forestry universities and colleges

Notes
 A common pronunciation of Clemson is [klɛmpsən]. Those not familiar with the local pronunciation often say [klɛmzən] or [klɛmsən], as the spelling would suggest. See generally The Routledge Handbook of Contemporary English Pronunciation.

References
Notes

External links

 
 Clemson Athletics website

 
Educational institutions established in 1889
Land-grant universities and colleges
Education in Pickens County, South Carolina
Universities and colleges accredited by the Southern Association of Colleges and Schools
Public universities and colleges in South Carolina
Buildings and structures in Pickens County, South Carolina
Tourist attractions in Pickens County, South Carolina
Clemson, South Carolina
1889 establishments in South Carolina